Creative Mythology is Volume IV of the comparative mythologist Joseph Campbell's The Masks of God. The book concerns "creative mythology", Campbell's term for the efforts by an individual to communicate his experience through signs, an attempt that can become "living myth".

Summary
Campbell writes that in "creative mythology", "the individual has had an experience of his own - of order, horror, beauty, or even mere exhilaration-which he seeks to communicate through signs; and if his realization has been of a certain depth and import, his communication will have the force and value of living myth-for those, that is to say, who receive and respond to it of themselves, with recognition, uncoerced.” Campbell gives as examples Thomas Mann and James Joyce.

References

1968 non-fiction books
American non-fiction books
Books by Joseph Campbell
English-language books
Mythology books